The Davis Rink was an indoor ice rink on the campus of Dartmouth College in Hanover, New Hampshire. The arena served as the home for the Dartmouth ice hockey program for nearly 50 years and was the last natural ice surface used for Division I hockey when it closed in 1975.

History
After having to field their team on Occom Pond throughout the 1920s, Dartmouth wanted a more permanent home for one of the premier college programs. The college erected Davis Rink in 1929 and, while it was one of the first indoor rinks for a college team, the ice was still natural and subject to weather conditions. While other rinks across the country would retrofit their facilities with artificial ice, Davis Rink would remain an open-air arena for its duration. Towards the end it was apparent that the arena was a drag on the program, with inconsistent ice and very sparse seating, and in 1975 the Thompson Arena was completed and served as the next home for the Big Green.

The Davis Rink would remain on campus until it was demolished in 1985 to make way for the Berry Sports Center.

References

Defunct college ice hockey venues in the United States
Defunct indoor arenas in the United States
Defunct sports venues in New Hampshire
Dartmouth College facilities
Buildings and structures in Hanover, New Hampshire
1929 establishments in New Hampshire
1975 disestablishments in New Hampshire
Sports venues demolished in 1985
Sports venues completed in 1929
Demolished sports venues in the United States
Indoor arenas in New Hampshire